Larry Graham Pittman (born September 30, 1954) is a former Republican member of the North Carolina House of Representatives. He represented the 83rd district (and the preceding 82nd district) (including constituents in Cabarrus County) from 2011 to 2023.

North Carolina General Assembly
Pittman was first appointed to the North Carolina House of Representatives on October 10, 2011 to replace fellow Republican Jeff Barnhart who resigned to join a consulting firm. Pittman has been re-elected to the seat a total of 5 times, most recently in 2020. On February 4, 2021, Pittman announced that he wouldn't seek re-election in 2022.

In February 2017, Pittman co-sponsored a bill allowing the removal of the ban on North Carolina seceding from the Union ever again. In March 2017 he co-sponsored a bill to once again make gay marriages not valid in North Carolina. Responding to criticisms to both bills, Pittman made controversial statements that were widely reported in the news media. In March 2016, Pittman was a co-sponsor of North Carolina's Bathroom bill.

HB 147
In February 2017, Pittman joined with Representatives Michael Speciale (R-Craven) and George Cleveland (R-Jacksonville) in proposing a constitutional amendment that would allow North Carolina voters to repeal Article I, Section 4 of the North Carolina Constitution. This article declares that "This State shall ever remain a member of the American Union; the people thereof are part of the American nation," and prohibits the state from seceding from the United States of America; its inclusion in North Carolina’s 1868 constitution was a condition for being readmitted into the Union after the Civil War.  The bill passed the first reading on February 22, 2017, and was referred to the Committee on Rules, Calendar, and Operations of the House.

HB 780
Pittman, Speciale, and Representative Carl Ford (R-China Grove) sponsored House Bill 780, which was introduced on March 14, 2017. This bill would end North Carolina's recognition of same sex marriage in disregard of the US Supreme Court ruling in Obergefell v. Hodges and cites the Bible as justification for this disregard.  The bill passed the first reading on April 13, 2017, and was referred to the Committee on Rules, Calendar, and Operations of the House. On the same day, however, state house speaker Tim Moore stated that the bill would not proceed further due to concerns about its constitutionality. In North Carolina, it is a common practice for bills that lack the support of party leadership to be sent to the Rules Committee to die.

HB 158
In February 2021, Pittman and North Carolina House Representative Mark Brody introduced House Bill 158, which aimed to classify abortion as first-degree murder and legalize the use of deadly force against those performing or receiving an abortion.

Controversial statements
On March 22, 2017, Pittman posted a newsletter on his Facebook page, giving his constituents an update on his activities.  Numerous constituents posted comments, and Pittman responded with controversial statements.

On June 15, 2020, the NC lawmaker posted on his Facebook page calling Seattle BLM protesters 'thugs' and 'vermin' and suggested police 'shoot' those resisting arrest.

U.S. Supreme Court opinion
In response to a commenter's criticism of HB 780, Pittman posted a comment on April 11, 2017, stating that North Carolina should uphold traditional marriage "in spite of the opinion of a federal court that had no business interfering."

Lincoln-Hitler comparison
Pittman's post in reference to the U.S. Supreme Court led to several comments on states' rights and a post telling Pittman that the Civil War was over, the Union had won, and to "get over it".  Pittman responded in a post on April 12, 2017, saying: "And if Hitler had won, should the world just get over it? Lincoln was the same sort if [sic] tyrant, and personally responsible for the deaths of over 800,000 Americans in a war that was unnecessary and unconstitutional."  He later deleted the post.

Climate change statement
In July 2012, Pittman issued a statement rejecting the scientific consensus on climate change: "Our climate runs on a cycle. It goes up and it goes down and the Lord designed it that way. And the main thing that causes global warming is the Earth's relationship to a big ball of gas that's burning out there that we call the Sun. And it is the height of hubris for human beings to think that we can have any effect on that."

Summary execution for protestors
In a June 2020 Facebook post, in response to the national protests sparked by the murder of George Floyd, Pittman called protesters "vermin" and "thugs" and opined that if they "resist and attack" police should shoot them.

Call for public hangings 
In 2012, Pittman called for the public hanging of doctors who provide abortions.

Electoral history

2020

2018

2016

2014

2012

2010

2008

References

|-

1954 births
Living people
People from Kinston, North Carolina
People from Concord, North Carolina
University of Mount Olive alumni
Barton College alumni
21st-century American politicians
Republican Party members of the North Carolina House of Representatives
20th-century Christians
21st-century Christians
20th-century Protestants
21st-century Protestants